Web server software allows computers to act as web servers. The first web servers supported only static files, such as HTML (and images), but now they commonly allow embedding of server side applications.

Some web application frameworks include simple HTTP servers.  For example the Django framework provides runserver, and PHP has a built-in server.  These are generally intended only for use during initial development.  A production server will require a more robust HTTP front-end such as one of the servers listed here.

Overview

Features
Some features may be intentionally not included to web server to avoid featuritis. For example:
 TLS/HTTPS may be enabled with a separate stunnel daemon that terminates TLS and redirects raw HTTP packets to http daemon.
 NGINX and OpenBSD httpd authors decided not to include CGI interpretation but instead use FastCGI. For OpenBSD was developed a slowcgi gateway.
 BusyBox httpd doesn't have automatically generated directory listing but it may be implemented as a CGI script

Operating system support

See also
 Comparison of application servers
 Embedded HTTP server
 Gunicorn (HTTP server)
 Helicon Ape

References

External links
 Netcraft Web Server Survey
 Usage Statistics and Market Share of Web Servers for Websites

Web Servers
Internet Protocol based network software